Juan Viedma is a paralympic athlete from Spain competing mainly in category F11 long and triple jump events.

Juan has competed in four paralympics starting with his home games in Spain in 1992.  He competed in the pentathlon and 100m before winning a silver in the long jump and gold in the triple jump.  The following games in 1996 he defended his triple jump gold medal but could only manage bronze in the long jump.  2000 saw him fail to medal in either of the jumps but he was part of the bronze medal-winning 4 × 100 m relay team for Spain.  He returned for a fourth games in 1996  where he competed in the long and triple jump but was unable to add any further medals.

References

Paralympic athletes of Spain
Athletes (track and field) at the 1992 Summer Paralympics
Athletes (track and field) at the 1996 Summer Paralympics
Athletes (track and field) at the 2000 Summer Paralympics
Athletes (track and field) at the 2004 Summer Paralympics
Paralympic gold medalists for Spain
Paralympic silver medalists for Spain
Paralympic bronze medalists for Spain
Living people
Medalists at the 1992 Summer Paralympics
Medalists at the 1996 Summer Paralympics
Medalists at the 2000 Summer Paralympics
Year of birth missing (living people)
Paralympic medalists in athletics (track and field)
Spanish male long jumpers
Spanish male triple jumpers
Spanish male sprinters
Visually impaired long jumpers
Visually impaired triple jumpers
Visually impaired sprinters
Paralympic sprinters
Paralympic long jumpers
Paralympic triple jumpers